John Grady may refer to:

John C. Grady (1847-1916), American lawyer and politician
John D. Grady (died 1880), American criminal
John Grady (baseball) (1858–1924), American baseball player
John Grady (Medal of Honor) (1872–1956), United States Navy officer and Medal of Honor recipient
John Grady (sociologist) (born 1960s) American sociologist
John Grady (author) (1923–1986), Australian author and social scientist
John F. Grady (1929–2019), U.S. federal judge